Miss Polski 2013 was the 24th Miss Polski pageant, held on December 8, 2013. The winner was Ada Sztajerowska of Łódź. In addition to receiving the title Sztajerowska also received a Chevrolet Spark. Sztajerowska represented Poland in both Miss World 2014 and Miss Supranational 2015.

Final results

Special Awards

Judges
 Lech Daniłowicz - President and Owner of Missland
 Klaudia Wiśniowska - 2nd Runner-Up of Miss Globe 2013
 Sławomir Stopczyk - owner of the Stoper brand
 Isabel Avoro Ela Mitogo - Miss Equatorial Guinea 2013
 Marek Nowotny - Representative of the Image company
 Lech Klimkowski - Representative of the Indykpol company
 Agnieszka Trusiewicz - Marketing Director of Pretty One
 Robert Czepiel - CEO of Jubiler Schubert
 Ewa Minge - Fashion Designer
 Katarzyna Krzeszowska - Miss Polski 2012
 Gerhard Parzutka von Lipiński - President of the Miss Polski competition

Finalists

Notes

Withdrawals
 Lublin
 Masovia

Did not compete
 Holy Cross
 Lubusz
 Subcarpathia
 West Pomerania
 Polish Community in Argentina
 Polish Community in Australia
 Polish Community in Belarus
 Polish Community in Brazil
 Polish Community in Canada
 Polish Community in France
 Polish Community in Germany
 Polish Community in Ireland
 Polish Community in Israel
 Polish Community in Lithuania
 Polish Community in Russia
 Polish Community in South Africa
 Polish Community in Sweden
 Polish Community in the U.K.
 Polish Community in the U.S.
 Polish Community in Venezuela

References

External links
Official Website

2013
2013 beauty pageants
2013 in Poland